Nasiaeschna pentacantha, the Cyrano Darner, is a species of dragonfly in the family Aeshnidae, and the only species in the genus Nasiaeschna.

References

Further reading

External links

 

Aeshnidae
Articles created by Qbugbot